Iraklis Metaxas (born 10 July 1967) is a Greek professional football manager.

Managerial statistics

References

1967 births
Living people
German people of Greek descent
German football managers
PAS Giannina F.C. managers
Sportspeople from Cologne
Asteras Tripolis F.C. managers
Super League Greece managers